Cary Guffey (born May 10, 1972) is an American former child actor and financial planner. He is best known for his debut in the role of Barry Guiler in the film Close Encounters of the Third Kind (1977).

Biography
Born in Douglasville, Georgia, Guffey was raised in West Windsor, New Jersey and attended West Windsor-Plainsboro High School South before graduating from the University of Florida with a degree in marketing and from Jacksonville State University with an M.B.A.

Guffey made his film debut in the 1977 film Close Encounters of the Third Kind. In 1979, he appeared in the movie The Sheriff and the Satellite Kid and its sequel Everything Happens to Me, with Bud Spencer. Guffey made his last onscreen appearance in the 1985 miniseries North and South.

As an adult, Guffey embarked on a career in financial services, first with Merrill Lynch, then, beginning in 2012, with PNC Investments.

Filmography

References

Bibliography 
 Holmstrom, John. The Moving Picture Boy: An International Encyclopaedia from 1895 to 1995, Norwich, Michael Russell, 1996, p. 390.

External links

1972 births
Male actors from Georgia (U.S. state)
Male actors from New Jersey
American male child actors
American male film actors
American male television actors
Jacksonville State University alumni
Living people
People from Douglasville, Georgia
University of Florida alumni
West Windsor-Plainsboro High School South alumni